African-American music is an umbrella term covering a diverse range of music and musical genres largely developed by African Americans and their culture. Its origins are in musical forms that developed as a result of the enslavement of African Americans prior to the American Civil War. It has been said that "every genre that is born from America has black roots."

White slave owners subjugated their slaves physically, mentally, and spiritually through brutal and demeaning acts. White Americans considered African Americans separate and unequal for centuries, going to extraordinary lengths to keep them oppressed. African-American slaves created a distinctive type of music that played an important role in the era of enslavement. Slave songs, commonly known as work songs, were used to combat the hardships of the physical labor. Work songs were also used to communicate with other slaves without the slave owner hearing. The  song "Wade in the Water" was sung by slaves to warn others trying to leave to use the water to obscure their trail. Following the Civil War, African Americans employed playing European music in military bands developed a new style called ragtime that gradually evolved into jazz. Jazz incorporated the sophisticated polyrhythmic structure of dance and folk music of peoples from western and Sub-Saharan Africa. These musical forms had a wide-ranging influence on the development of music within the United States and around the world during the 20th century.

Analyzing African music through the lens of European musicology can leave out much of the cultural use of sound and methods of music making. Some methods of African music making are translated more clearly though the music itself, and not in written form.

Blues and ragtime were developed during the late 19th century through the fusion of West African vocalizations, which employed the natural harmonic series and blue notes. "If one considers the five criteria given by Waterman as cluster characteristics for West African music, one finds that three have been well documented as being characteristic of Afro-American music. Call-and-response organizational procedures, dominance of a percussive approach to music, and off-beat phrasing of melodic accents have been cited as typical of the genre in virtually every study of any kind of African-American music from work songs, field or street calls, shouts, and spirituals to blues and jazz."

The earliest jazz and blues recordings were made in the 1920s, and African-American musicians developed related styles such as rhythm and blues in the 1940s. In the 1960s, soul performers had a major influence on white US and British singers. In the mid-1960s, black musicians developed funk and were leading figures in late 1960s and 1970s genre of fusion. In the 1970s and 1980s, black artists developed hip-hop, and in the 1980s introduced the disco-infused dance style known as house music. The National Museum of African American Music opened in Nashville, Tennessee on January 18, 2021. "It’s the only museum in the U.S. to showcase the 50-plus musical genres and styles created or influenced by African Americans — spirituals, gospel tunes, jazz, hip-hop and more."

Historic traits

Most slaves arrived to the Americas from the western coast of Africa. This area encompasses modern-day Nigeria, Ghana, Ivory Coast, Senegal, Gambia and parts of Sierra Leone. Harmonic and rhythmic features from these areas, European musical instrumentation, and the chattel slavery forced upon Black Americans all contributed to their music.

Many of the characteristic musical forms that define African-American music have historical precedents. These earlier forms include: field hollers, beat boxing, work song , spoken word, rapping, scatting, call and response, vocality (or special vocal effect: guttural effects, interpolated vocality, falsetto, melisma, vocal rhythmization), improvisation, blue notes, polyrhythms (syncopation, concrescence, tension, improvisation, percussion, swung note), texture (antiphony, homophony, polyphony, heterophony) and harmony (vernacular progressions; complex, multi-part harmony, as in spirituals, Doo Wop, and barbershop music).

American composer Olly Wilson outlines "heterogeneous sound ideals" that define traditional and common patterns in African Music, such as the use of timbre, pitch, volume and duration, and the incorporation of the body in making music. His findings include uses of call-and-response and the importance of interjectionss from the audience to express satisfaction or dissatisfaction. These heterogeneous sound ideals are also found in many other types of music.

History

18th century

In the late 18th century folk spirituals originated among Southern slaves following their conversion to Christianity. Slaves reinterpreted the practice of Christianity in a way that had meaning to them as Africans in America. They often sang the spirituals in groups as they worked the plantation fields. African-American spirituals (Negro Spirituals) were created in invisible churches and regular Black churches. The hymns, melody, and rhythms were similar to songs heard in West Africa. Enslaved and free blacks created their own words and tunes. Themes include the hardships of slavery and the hope of freedom.

Spirituals from the era of slavery are called Slave Shout Songs. These shout songs are sung today by Gullah Geechee people and other African Americans in churches and praise houses. During slavery, these songs were coded messages that spoke of escape from slavery on the Underground Railroad and were sung by enslaved African Americans in plantation fields to send coded messages to other slaves, unbeknownst to the slaveholders. Harriet Tubman sang coded messages to her mother and other slaves in the field to let them know she was escaping on the Underground Railroad. Tubman sang: "I'm sorry I'm going to leave you, farewell, oh farewell; But I'll meet you in the morning, farewell, oh farewell, I'll meet you in the morning, I'm bound for the promised land, On the other side of Jordan, Bound for the Promised Land." 

Slaves also used drums to communicate messages of escape. In West Africa, drums are used for communication, celebration, and spiritual ceremonies. West African people enslaved in the United States continued to make drums to send coded messages to other slaves across plantations. The making and use of drums by enslaved Africans was outlawed after the Stono Rebellion in South Carolina in 1739. Enslaved African Americans used drums to send coded messages to start slave revolts, and white slaveholders banned the creation and use of drums. After the banning of drums, slaves made rhythmic music by slapping their knees, thighs, arms and other body parts, a practice called pattin Juba. The Juba dance was originally brought by Kongo slaves to Charleston, South Carolina, and became an African-American plantation dance performed by slaves during gatherings when rhythm instruments were prohibited.     

Folk spirituals, unlike much white gospel, were often spirited. Slaves added dancing (later known as "the shout") and other body movements to the singing. They also changed the melodies and rhythms of psalms and hymns, by speeding up the tempo, adding repeated refrains and choruses, and replacing texts with new ones that often combined English and African words and phrases. Originally passed down orally, folk spirituals have been central in the lives of African Americans for more than three centuries, serving religious, cultural, social, political, and historical functions.

Folk spirituals were spontaneously created and performed in a repetitive, improvised style. The most common song structures are the call-and-response ("Blow, Gabriel") and repetitive choruses ("He Rose from the Dead"). The call-and-response is an alternating exchange between the soloist and the other singers. The soloist usually improvises a line to which the other singers respond, repeating the same phrase. Song interpretation incorporates the interjections of moans, cries, hollers, and changing vocal timbres, and can be accompanied by hand clapping and foot-stomping.

The Smithsonian Institution Folkways Recordings have samples of African American slave shout songs.

19th century

The influence of African Americans on mainstream American music began in the 19th century with the advent of blackface minstrelsy. The banjo, of African origin, became a popular instrument, and its African-derived rhythms were incorporated into popular songs by Stephen Foster and other songwriters. Over time the banjo's construction adopted some European traditions such as a flat fingerboard. Some banjos had five strings, in contrast to the West African three-string version. This resulted in the creation of several different types of banjos in the United States.

In the 1830s, the Second Great Awakening led to a rise in Christian revivals, especially among African Americans. Drawing on traditional work songs, enslaved African Americans originated and performed a wide variety of spirituals and other Christian music. Some of these songs were coded messages of subversion against slaveholders, or signals to escape.

During the period after the Civil War, the spread of African-American music continued. The Fisk University Jubilee Singers first toured in 1871. Artists including Jack Delaney helped revolutionize post-war African-American music in the central-east of the United States. In the following years, professional "jubilee" troops formed and toured. The first black musical-comedy troupe, Hyers Sisters Comic Opera Co., was organized in 1876. In the last half of the 19th century, barbershops often served as community centers, where men would gather. Barbershop quartets originated with African-American men socializing in barbershops; they would harmonize while waiting their turn, singing spirituals, folk songs and popular songs. This generated a new style of unaccompanied four-part, close-harmony singing. Later, white minstrel singers stole the style, and in the early days of the recording industry their performances were recorded and sold. By the end of the 19th century, African-American music was an integral part of mainstream American culture.

Early 20th century (1900s–1930s)

The first musical written and produced by African Americans, by Bob Cole and Billy Johnson, debuted on Broadway in 1898. The first recording of black musicians was of Bert Williams and George Walker in 1901, featuring music from Broadway musicals. Theodore Drury helped black artists develop in opera. He founded the Drury Opera Company in 1900 and used a white orchestra, but featured black singers in leading roles and choruses. The company was only active until 1908, but it marked the first black participation in opera companies. Scott Joplin's opera Treemonisha, unique as a ragtime-folk opera, was first performed in 1911.

The early part of the 20th century saw a rise in popularity of blues and jazz. African-American music at this time was classed as "race music". Ralph Peer, musical director at Okeh Records, put records made by "foreign" groups under that label. At the time "race" was a term commonly used by the African-American press to speak of the community as a whole with an empowering point of view, as a person of "race" was one involved in fighting for equal rights. Ragtime performers such as Scott Joplin became popular and some were associated with the Harlem Renaissance and early civil rights activists. White and Latino performers of African-American music were also visible. African-American music was often altered and diluted to be more palatable for white audiences, who would not have accepted black performers, leading to genres like swing music.

By the turn of the 20th century African Americans were becoming part of classical music as well. Originally excluded from major symphony orchestras, black musicians could study in music conservatories that had been founded in the 1860s, such as the Oberlin School of Music, National Conservatory of Music, and the New England Conservatory. Black people also formed symphony orchestras in major cities such as Chicago, New Orleans, and Philadelphia. Various black orchestras began to perform regularly in the late 1890s and the early 20th century. In 1906, the first incorporated black orchestra was established in Philadelphia. In the early 1910s, all-black music schools, such as the Music School Settlement for Colored and the Martin-Smith School of Music, were founded in New York.

The Music School Settlement for Colored became a sponsor of the Clef Club orchestra in New York. The Clef Club Symphony Orchestra attracted both black and white audiences to concerts at Carnegie Hall from 1912 to 1915. Conducted by James Reese Europe and William H. Tyers, the orchestra included banjos, mandolins, and baritone horns. Concerts featured music written by black composers, notably Harry T. Burleigh and Will Marion Cook. Other annual black concert series include the William Hackney's "All-Colored Composers" concerts in Chicago and the Atlanta Colored Music Festivals.

The return of the black musical to Broadway occurred in 1921 with Sissle and Eubie Blake's Shuffle Along. In 1927, a concert survey of black music was performed at Carnegie Hall including jazz, spirituals and the symphonic music of W. C. Handy's Orchestra and the Jubilee Singers. The first major film musical with a black cast was King Vidor's Hallelujah of 1929. African-American performers were featured in the musical Show Boat (which had a part written for Paul Robeson and a chorus of Jubilee Singers), and especially all-black operas such as Porgy and Bess and Virgil Thomson's Four Saints in Three Acts of 1934.

The first symphony by a black composer to be performed by a major orchestra was William Grant Still's Afro-American Symphony (1930) by the New York Philharmonic. Florence Beatrice Price's Symphony in E minor was performed in 1933 by the Chicago Symphony Orchestra. In 1934, William Dawson's Negro Folk Symphony was performed by the Philadelphia Orchestra.

Mid-20th century (1940s–1960s)

Billboard started making a separate list of hit records for African-American music in October 1942 with the "Harlem Hit Parade", which was changed in 1945 to "Race Records", and then in 1949 to "Rhythm and Blues Records".

By the 1940s, cover versions of African-American songs were commonplace, frequently topping the charts while the original versions did not reach the mainstream. In 1955, Thurman Ruth persuaded a gospel group to sing in the Apollo Theater. This presentation of gospel music in a secular setting was successful, and he arranged gospel caravans that traveled around the country playing venues that rhythm and blues singers had popularized. Meanwhile, jazz performers began to move away from swing towards music with more intricate arrangements, more improvisation, and technically challenging forms. This culminated in bebop, the modal jazz of Miles Davis, and the free jazz of Ornette Coleman and John Coltrane.

African-American musicians in the 1940s and 1950s were developing rhythm and blues into rock and roll, which featured a strong backbeat. Prominent exponents of this style included Louis Jordan and Wynonie Harris. Rock and roll music became commercially successful with recordings of white musicians, however, such as Bill Haley and Elvis Presley, playing a guitar-based fusion of black rock and roll and rockabilly. Rock music became more associated with white artists, although some black performers such as Chuck Berry and Bo Diddley had commercial success.

In 2017, National Public Radio wrote about the career of Sister Rosetta Tharpe and concluded with these comments: Tharpe "was a gospel singer at heart who became a celebrity by forging a new path musically ... Through her unforgettable voice and gospel swing crossover style, Tharpe influenced a generation of musicians including Aretha Franklin, Chuck Berry and countless others ... She was, and is, an unmatched artist."

As the 1940s came to a close, other African Americans endeavored to concertize as classical musicians in an effort to transcend racial and nationalistic barriers in the post-war era. In 1948 Henry Lewis became the first African-American instrumentalist in a leading American symphony orchestra, an early "musical ambassador" in support of cultural diplomacy in Europe, and the first African-American conductor of a major American symphonic ensemble in 1968.

The term "rock and roll" had a strong sexual connotation in jump blues and R&B, but when DJ Alan Freed referred to rock and roll on mainstream radio in the mid 50s, "the sexual component had been dialed down enough that it simply became an acceptable term for dancing".

R&B was a strong influence on rock and roll, according to many sources, including a 1985 Wall Street Journal article titled, "Rock! It's Still Rhythm and Blues". The author states that the "two terms were used interchangeably", until about 1957.

Fats Domino was not convinced that there was any new genre. In 1957 he said: "What they call rock 'n' roll now is rhythm and blues. I’ve been playing it for 15 years in New Orleans". According to Rolling Stone, "this is a valid statement ... all Fifties rockers, black and white, country born and city bred, were fundamentally influenced by R&B, the black popular music of the late Forties and early Fifties". Elvis Presley's recognition of the importance of artists such as Fats Domino was significant, according to a 2017 article: the "championing of black musicians as part of a narrative that saw many positives in growing young white interest in African American-based musical styles". At a press event in 1969, Presley introduced Fats Domino, and said, "that’s the real King of Rock ‘n’ Roll" ... a huge influence on me when I started out".

By the mid-1950s, many R&B songs were getting "covered" by white artists and the recordings got more airplay on the mainstream radio stations. For example, "Presley quickly covered "Tutti Frutti" ...So did Pat Boone", according to New Yorker. "In 1956, seventy-six per cent of top R.&.B. songs also made the pop chart; in 1957, eighty-seven per cent made the pop chart; in 1958, it was ninety-four per cent. The marginal market had become the main market, and the majors had got into the act."

The 1950s also saw increased popularity of blues, both in the US and the UK, in the style from the early 20th century. Doo-wop also become popular in the 1950s. Doo-wop had been developed through vocal group harmony, employing different vocal parts, nonsense syllables, little or no instrumentation, and simple lyrics. It usually involved single artists appearing with a backing group. Solo billing was given to lead singers who were more prominent in the musical arrangement. A secularized form of American gospel music called soul also developed in the mid-1950s, with pioneers such as Ray Charles, Jackie Wilson and Sam Cooke leading the wave. Soul and R&B became a major influence on surf music, and with chart-topping girl groups including The Angels and The Shangri-Las. In 1959, Hank Ballard released a song for the new dance style "The Twist", which became a new dance craze in the early '60s.

In 1959, Berry Gordy founded Motown Records, the first record label to primarily feature African-American artists, which aimed at achieving crossover success. The label developed an innovative, and commercially successful, style of soul music with distinctive pop elements. Its early roster included The Miracles, Martha and the Vandellas, Marvin Gaye, The Temptations, and The Supremes. Black divas such as Aretha Franklin became '60s crossover stars. In the UK, British blues became a gradually mainstream phenomenon, returning to the United States in the form of the British Invasion, a group of bands led by The Beatles and The Rolling Stones who performed blues and R&B-inspired pop with both traditional and modern aspects. WGIV in Charlotte, North Carolina, was one of a few radio stations dedicated to African-American music that started during this period.

The British Invasion knocked many black artists off the US pop charts, although some, like Otis Redding, Wilson Pickett, Aretha Franklin and a number of Motown artists, continued to do well. Soul music, however, remained popular among black people through new forms such as funk, developed out of the innovations of James Brown. In 1961, 11-year-old Stevland Hardaway Morris made his first record under Motown's Tamla label as Stevie Wonder.

In 1964 the Civil Rights Act outlawed major forms of discrimination towards African Americans and women. As tensions began to diminish, more African-American musicians crossed over into the mainstream. Some artists who successfully crossed over were Aretha Franklin, James Brown, and Ella Fitzgerald in the pop and jazz worlds, and Leontyne Price and Kathleen Battle in classical music.

By the end of the decade, black people were part of the psychedelia and early heavy metal trends, particularly by way of the ubiquitous Beatles' influence and the electric guitar innovations of Jimi Hendrix. Hendrix was among the first guitarists to use audio feedback, fuzz, and other effects pedals such as the wah wah pedal to create a unique guitar solo sound. Psychedelic soul, a mix of psychedelic rock and soul began to flourish with the 1960s culture. Even more popular among black people, and with more crossover appeal, was album-oriented soul in the late 1960s and early 1970s, which revolutionized African-American music. The genre's intelligent and introspective lyrics, often with a socially aware tone, were created by artists such as Marvin Gaye in What's Going On, and Stevie Wonder in Songs in the Key of Life.

1970s

In the 1970s, album-oriented soul continued its popularity while musicians such as Smokey Robinson helped turn it into Quiet Storm music. Funk evolved into two strands, a pop-soul-jazz-bass fusion pioneered by Sly & the Family Stone, and a more psychedelic fusion epitomized by George Clinton and his P-Funk ensemble. Disco evolved from black musicians creating soul music with an up-tempo melody. Isaac Hayes, Barry White, Donna Summer, and others helped popularize disco, which gained mainstream success.

Some African-American artists including The Jackson 5, Roberta Flack, Teddy Pendergrass, Dionne Warwick, Stevie Wonder, The O'Jays, Gladys Knight & the Pips, and Earth, Wind & Fire found crossover audiences, while white listeners preferred country rock, singer-songwriters, stadium rock, soft rock, glam rock, and, to some degree, heavy metal and punk rock.

During the 1970s, The Dozens, an urban African-American tradition of using playful rhyming ridicule, developed into street jive in the early '70s, which in turn inspired hip-hop by the late 1970s. Spoken-word artists such as The Watts Prophets, The Last Poets, Gil Scott-Heron and Melvin Van Peebles were some innovators of early hip-hop. Many youths in the Bronx used this medium to communicate the unfairness minorities faced at the time. DJs played records, typically funk, while MCs introduced tracks to the dancing audience. Over time, DJs began isolating and repeating the percussion breaks, producing a constant, eminently danceable beat, over which MCs began rapping, using rhyme and sustained lyrics. Hip-hop would become a multicultural movement in a youthful black America, led by artists such as Kurtis Blow and Run-DMC.

1980s

Michael Jackson had record-breaking success with his 1980s albums Off the Wall, Bad, and the best-selling album of all time, Thriller. Jackson paved the way for other successful crossover black solo artists such as Prince, Lionel Richie, Luther Vandross, Tina Turner, Whitney Houston, and Janet Jackson (Michael's sister). Pop and dance-soul of this era inspired new jack swing by the end of the decade.

Hip-hop spread across the country and diversified. Techno, dance, Miami bass, post-disco, Chicago house, Los Angeles hardcore and Washington, D.C. Go-go developed during this period, with only Miami bass achieving mainstream success. Before long, Miami bass was relegated primarily to the Southeastern US, while Chicago house had made strong headway on college campuses and dance arenas (i.e. the warehouse sound, the rave). Washington's Go-go garnered modest national attention with songs such as E.U.'s Da Butt (1988), but  proved to be a mostly regional phenomena. Chicago house sound had expanded into the Detroit music environment and began using more electronic and industrial sounds, creating Detroit techno, acid, and jungle. The combination of these experimental, usually DJ-oriented, sounds with the multiethnic NYC disco sound from the 1970s and 1980s created a brand of music that was most appreciated in large discothèques in large cities. European audiences embraced this kind of electronic dance music with more enthusiasm than their North American counterparts.

From about 1986, rap entered the mainstream with Run-D.M.C.'s Raising Hell, and the Beastie Boys' Licensed to Ill. Licensed to Ill was the first rap album to enter the No.1 Spot on the Billboard 200 and opened the door for white rappers. Both of these groups  mixed rap and rock, appealing to both audiences. Hip-hop took off from its roots and the golden age hip hop flourished, with artists such as Eric B. & Rakim, Public Enemy, LL Cool J, Queen Latifah, Big Daddy Kane, and Salt-N-Pepa. Hip-hop became popular in the United States and became a worldwide phenomenon in the late 1990s. The golden age scene would end by the early 1990s as gangsta rap and G-funk took over, with West Coast artists Dr. Dre, Snoop Dogg, Warren G and Ice Cube, East Coast artists Notorious B.I.G., Wu-Tang Clan, and Mobb Deep, and the sounds of urban black male bravado, compassion, and social awareness.

While heavy metal music was almost exclusively created by white performers in the 1970s and 1980s, there were a few exceptions. In 1988, all-black heavy metal band Living Colour achieved mainstream success with their début album Vivid, peaking at No. 6 on the Billboard 200, thanks to their Top 20 single "Cult of Personality". The band's music contained lyrics that attack what they perceived as Eurocentrism and racism in America. A decade later, more black artists like Lenny Kravitz, Body Count, Ben Harper, and countless others would start playing rock again.

1990s, 2000s, 2010s, and today

Contemporary R&B, the post-disco version of soul music, remained popular throughout the 1980s and 1990s. Male vocal groups such as The Temptations and The O'Jays were particularly popular, as well as New Edition, Boyz II Men, Jodeci, Dru Hill, Blackstreet, and Jagged Edge. Girl groups, including TLC, Destiny's Child, SWV, and En Vogue were also highly successful.

Singer-songwriters such as R. Kelly, Mariah Carey, Montell Jordan, D'Angelo, Aaliyah, and Raphael Saadiq of Tony! Toni! Toné! were also popular during the 1990s. Mary J. Blige, Faith Evans, and BLACKstreet popularized a fusion blend known as hip-hop soul. The neo soul movement of the 1990s, with classic soul influences, was popularized in the late 1990s and early 2000s by such artists as D'Angelo, Erykah Badu, Maxwell, Lauryn Hill, India.Arie, Alicia Keys, Jill Scott, Angie Stone, Bilal, and Musiq Soulchild. A record review claimed that D'Angelo's critically acclaimed album Voodoo (2000) "represents African American music at a crossroads ... To simply call [it] neo-classical soul ... would be [to] ignore the elements of vaudeville jazz, Memphis horns, ragtime blues, funk and bass grooves, not to mention hip-hop, that slips out of every pore of these haunted songs." Blue-eyed soul is soul music performed by white artists, including Michael McDonald, Christina Aguilera, Amy Winehouse, Robin Thicke, Michael Bolton, Jon B., Lisa Stansfield, Teena Marie, Justin Timberlake, Joss Stone, George Michael, and Anastacia.

Along with the singer-songwriter influence on hip-hop and R&B, there was an increase in creativity and expression through Rap music. Tupac, The Notorious B.I.G. ("Biggie"), N.W.A, Lil Kim, Snoop Dog, and Nas broke into the music industry. '90s rap introduced many other subgenres including Gangsta rap, Conscious rap, and Pop rap. Gangsta rap focused on gang violence, drug dealing and poverty. It was also a major player in the East Coast–West Coast hip hop rivalry. Main players in this rivalry were Tupac and Suge Knight on the West Coast and The Notorious B.I.G. and Diddy on the East Coast.

By the early 2000s R&B began to emphasize solo artists with pop appeal, including Usher, Beyoncé, and the Caribbean-born Rihanna. This music was accompanied by creative and unique music videos such as Beyoncé's "Crazy in Love", Rihanna's "Pon de Replay", and Usher's "Caught Up". These videos helped R&B become more profitable and more popular than it had been in the 1990s. The line between hip-hop, R&B, and pop was blurred by producers such as Timbaland and Lil Jon, and by artists like Missy Elliott, T-Pain, Nelly, Akon, and OutKast.

Hip-hop remains a genre created and dominated by African-Americans. In its early years the lyrics were about the hardships of being black in the United States. White-owned record labels controlled how hip-hop was marketed, resulting in changes to the lyrics and culture of hip-hop to suit white audiences. Scholars and African-American hip-hop creators noticed this change. Hip-hop is used to sell cars, cell phones, and other merchandise.

The hip-hop movement has become increasingly mainstream as the music industry has taken control of it. Essentially, "from the moment 'Rapper's Delight' went platinum, hiphop the folk culture became hiphop the American entertainment-industry sideshow."

 In the early 2000s, 50 Cent was one of the most popular African-American artists. In 2005, his album The Massacre sold over one million albums in its first week. In 2008, Lil Wayne’s album Tha Carter III also sold more than a million copies in its first week.

Within a year of Michael Jackson's unexpected death in 2009, his estate generated $1.4 billion in revenues. A documentary containing rehearsal footage for Jackson's scheduled This Is It tour, entitled Michael Jackson's This Is It, was released on October 28, 2009, and became the highest-grossing concert film in history.

In 2013, no African-American musician had a Billboard Hot 100 number one, the first year in which there was not a number-one record by an African-American in the chart's 55-year history. J. Cole, Beyonce, Jay Z, and half-Canadian Drake, were all top-selling music artists this year, but none made it to the Billboard Hot 100's number one, leading to much debate.

Black protest music went mainstream in the 2010s. Beyoncé, her sister Solange, Kanye West, Frank Ocean, and Rihanna released black protest albums. Beyoncé released her first "black protest" album Lemonade in 2016.

In the late 2010s, mumble rap which originated from African-American vernacular English became popular with artists such as Playboi Carti, Young Thug, and Lil Baby. Mumble rap focuses on the melody of the song rather than on the lyrics, and has a big instrumental base. In a conversation with well-known mumble rapper HipHopDx, Future said: "When I freestyle I know there are bits you don’t really understand, but that’s what you like it for – that's what its all about to me, that's art."

Cultural impact 
Through the hybridization of African, European, and Native American cultural elements, African American music has made itself "a distinctly American phenomenon".

Jim Crow & Civil Rights Eras (early to mid 20th century) 
The music made during the Jim Crow and Civil Rights era awakened "the passion and purposefulness of the Southern Civil Rights Movement" that "provided a stirring musical accompaniment to the campaign for racial justice and equality". African-American men, women, and children from across the nation came together in social settings such as marches, mass meetings, churches, and even jails and "conveyed the moral urgency of the freedom struggle". African-American music served to uplift the spirits and hearts of those fighting for civil rights. Guy Carawan referred to the Civil Rights Movement as "the greatest singing movement this country has experienced".

"We Shall Overcome" 
Often called "the anthem of the Civil Rights Movement", "We Shall Overcome" was a hymn from the 19th-century that was used as a protest labor song in a labor strike against American Tobacco in Charleston, South Carolina in 1945–1946. It was overheard by Zilhpia Horton in a Tennessee tobacco field on a picket line in 1946, and a worker by the name of Lucille Simmons changed the original wording of "I Will Overcome" to "We Will Overcome", which made it more powerful for the Civil Rights Movement.

In 1947, Horton added some verses to the song and taught Pete Seeger her version. Seeger revised the song from "We will" to "We shall". In April 1960 at Raleigh, North Carolina, folk singer Guy Carawan sang the new version at the founding convention of the Student Nonviolent Coordinating Committee (SNCC), starting its quick spread throughout the Civil Rights Movement. Seeger, Carawan, and Frank Hamilton copyrighted the song to prevent it from becoming a "commercialized pop song".

"We Shall Overcome" continued to spread rapidly as the Civil Rights Movement gained supporters and momentum. Protestors across the nation sang the song as they marched for rights, were beat up, attacked by police dogs, and sent to jail for breaking segregation laws. "We Shall Overcome" and many other protest songs during the Civil Rights movement became its soundtrack. Outside of the U.S., the song has been used in freedom movements around the world. In India, the song is known as "Hum Honge Kaamyaab", which is a song that most school children in India know by heart.

Harlem Cultural Festival (1969) 
The Harlem Cultural Festival was a series of music concerts held in Harlem's Mount Morris Park in New York City. This festival "celebrated African-American music and culture and promoted the continued politics of Black pride". At 3 PM on Sundays from June 29, 1969 to August 24, 1969, artists would perform to an audience of tens of thousands of people. Such artists that performed were Stevie Wonder, Nina Simone, B.B. King, Sly and the Family Stone, The 5th Dimension, Gladys Knight & the Pips, Mahalia Jackson, and many others.

Economic impact
Record stores played a vital role in African-American communities for many decades. In the 1960s and 1970s, between 500 and 1,000 black-owned record stores operated in the American South, and probably twice as many in the United States as a whole. According to The Political Economy of Black Music By Norman Kelley,"Black music exists in a neo-colonial relationship with the $12 billion music industry, which consist of six record companies." African-American entrepreneurs embraced record stores as key vehicles for economic empowerment and critical public spaces for black consumers at a time that many black-owned businesses were closing amid desegregation. Countless African Americans have worked as musical performers, club owners, radio deejays, concert promoters, and record label owners. Many companies use African-American music to sell their products. Companies like Coca-Cola, Nike, and Pepsi have used African-American music in advertising.

International influence
Jazz and hip-hop traveled to Africa and Asia and influenced other genres of African and Asian Music. Many state that without African-American music, there would be no American music.  The songs that Africans brought to America created a foundation for American music. The textural styles, slang and African-American Vernacular English influenced American pop culture and global culture. The way African Americans dress in hip-hop videos and how African Americans talk is copied in the American market and the global market.

Afrobeat
Afrobeat is a West African genre of music created by Nigerian artist Fela Kuti. Afrobeat began during the early twentieth century when artists from Ghana and West Africa combined their music with Western calypso and jazz. The years between the wars (1918–1939) were a particularly fertile time for the formation of pan-West African urban musical traditions. Kuti fused traditional West African music with African-American music of Jazz, R&B, and other genres of West African and African-American music. James Brown's funk music, dance style, and African-American drumming influenced Afrobeat. In London, Kuti joined jazz and rock bands, and returned to Nigeria, creating Afrobeat by fusing African-American and traditional Yoruba music. In 1969, Kuti toured the United States and became inspired by the political activism of African Americans. He studied the life of Malcolm X and was inspired by his pro-black speeches. This resulted in a change in Kuti's message as he began discussing the political issues in Africa and Nigeria. In contrast, "Afrobeats" is a term applied to a large range of genres popular all over Africa. Music referred to as Afrobeats, in contrast to Kuti, is frequently upbeat, digitally generated, and sung in English, West African, and pidgin languages. Kuti's music was characterized by its political content and orchestral style whereas Afrobeats took influence from many musical themes found in R&B and Hip-Hop/Rap (Love, sex, drugs, money, hard times, fame).

Racial appropriation and insensitivity in K-pop music 
Hip-hop came to Korea in the 1990s and developed into Korean hip-hop and Korean K-pop music. Some Korean artists have appropriated African-American vernacular and other aspects of Black culture. Groups like the girl group MAMAMOO have been known to dress in blackface, and others speak in "blaccents" and wear their hair in ethnic styles. Artist Zico has used the n-word in his music, and has claimed that he has a "black soul." As of 2020, within "K-pop, blackface, mouthing or saying racial slurs, and purely aesthetic uses of Black culture and hairstyles" were still common, without necessarily understanding, honoring or crediting their African-American roots. According to sources cited in a 2020 Guardian article, many K-pop artists do not show support for African-American social justice issues. "[M]any international fans are waiting for the industry to develop a more sensitive, globalized understanding of race." In Korean there are phrases that have been misconstrued to sound like the a racial slur. These include the phrase "because of" (니까), pronounced 'nikka' and the word "you" or "you're" (니가), pronounced 'neega'.

See also

 African-American culture
 African-American dance
 African American musical theater
 Groove
 Afro-Caribbean music
 Blackface
 Cultural appropriation
 Culture of Africa
 Culture of the United States
 Culture of the Southern United States
 Gandy dancer
 Juke joint
 List of musical genres of the African diaspora
 Music of Africa
 Music of the African diaspora
 Cajun music
 Creole music
 Music of Baltimore
 Music of Detroit
 Music of Georgia (U.S. state)
 Music of New Orleans
 Music of the United States
 Jewish music
 Mexican music
 National Museum of African American Music
 Romani music

References

Sources
 Southern, Eileen (1997). The Music of Black Americans: A History. W. W. Norton & Company; 3rd edition. 
 Stewart, Earl L. (1998). African American Music: An Introduction. .
 Cobb, Charles E., Jr., "Traveling the Blues Highway", National Geographic Magazine, April 1999, v. 195, n.4
 Dixon, RMW & Godrich, J (1981), Blues and Gospel Records: 1902–1943, Storyville, London.
 Hamilton, Marybeth: In Search of the Blues.
 Leadbitter, M., & Slaven, N. (1968), Blues Records 1943–1966, Oak Publications, London.
 Ferris, William; Give My Poor Heart Ease: Voices of the Mississippi Blues, University of North Carolina Press (2009).   (with CD and DVD)
 Ferris, William; Glenn Hinson, The New Encyclopedia of Southern Culture: Volume 14: Folklife, University of North Carolina Press (2009).   (Cover :photo of James Son Thomas)
 Ferris, William; Blues From The Delta, Da Capo Press; revised edition (1988).  
 Gioia, Ted; Delta Blues: The Life and Times of the Mississippi Masters Who Revolutionized American Music, W. W. Norton & Company (2009).  
 Harris, Sheldon; Blues Who's Who, Da Capo Press, 1979.
 Nicholson, Robert; Mississippi Blues Today! Da Capo Press (1999).  
 Palmer, Robert; Deep Blues: A Musical and Cultural History of the Mississippi Delta, Penguin reprint (1982). ; 
 Ramsey Jr, Frederic; Been Here And Gone, 1st edition (1960), Rutgers University Press; London Cassell (UK) and New Brunswick, NJ. 2nd printing (1969), Rutgers University Press, New Brunswick, NJ: University Of Georgia Press, 2000.
 Wilson, Charles Reagan, William Ferris, Ann J. Adadie, Encyclopedia of Southern Culture (1656 pp.), University of North Carolina Press; 2nd edition (1989). .

Further reading
 Joshua Clark Davis, "For the Records: How African American Consumers and Music Retailers Created Commercial Public Space in the 1960s and 1970s South," Southern Cultures, Winter 2011.
Work, John W., compiler (1940), American Negro Songs and Spirituals: a Comprehensive Collection of 230 Folk Songs, Religious and Secular, with a Foreword. Bonanza Books, New York. N.B.: Consists most notably of an analytical study of this repertory, on p. 1–46, an anthology of such music (words with the notated music, harmonized), on pp. 47–250, and a bibliography, on p. 252–256.

External links

 A collection of African-American Gospel Music from the Library of Congress
 Shall We Gather at the River, a collection of African-American sacred music, made available for public use by the State Archives of Florida
 20 historical milestones in African-American music
 
 History of African music

 
African-American musicians
African-American culture
American styles of music
Ethnic music in the United States